Coleophora geghardella is a moth of the family Coleophoridae.

References

geghardella
Moths described in 1994